The Rangi (Rangi: Valangi; Swahili: Warangi) are a Bantu-speaking ethnic group of mixed Bantu and Cushitic heritage in the Dodoma Region of central Tanzania. In 2022, the Rangi population was estimated to number 880,000.

Endonym & Exonym 
The Rangi use the endonym Valangi to refer to themselves, however the Swahili exonym Warangi is more commonly used in Tanzania to refer to group. Likewise, the Rangi use the endonym Kilangi to refer to their language, but most people in Tanzania use the Swahili exonym of Kirangi instead. In English, the Swahili plural prefix of Wa and the Swahili artifact prefix of Ki are often dropped, resulting in both the people and language being referred to as Rangi.

History 
Sources differ on when the Rangi became a distinct ethnic group, with some suggesting approximately 300 AD and others say around the range of 1500-1700. Despite being a Bantu ethnic group, most Rangi do not believe that their ancestors came from the West, and that they actually came from the North and East (Ethiopia and Sudan). Meanwhile, other Rangi believe that their ancestors originated from the West. This makes sense as the Rangi have both Cushitic (Northeastern) and Bantu (Western) heritage. When the Rangi arrived in the Dodoma region they began assimilating surrounding Cushitic peoples, primarily the Alagwa and Burunge. The Rangi also assimilated the neighboring Nyaturu people, another Bantu ethnic group.

References

Fosbrooke, H.A. 1958 “Blessing the Year: a Wasi/Rangi Ceremony”, Tanganyika Notes and Records 50, 21-2
Fosbrooke, H.A. 1958 “A Rangi Circumcision Ceremony: Blessing a New Grove”, Tanganyika Notes and Records 50, 30-36
Gray, R.F. 1953 “Notes on Irangi Houses”, Tanganyika Notes and Records 35, 45-52
Kesby, J. 1981 “The Rangi of Tanzania: An introduction to their culture”, HRAF: Yale
Kesby, J. 1982 “Progress and the past among the Rangi of Tanzania”, HRAF: Yale
Kesby, J. 1986 “Rangi natural history: The taxonomic procedures of an African people”, HRAF: Yale
Maingu, Yovin & Brunhilde Bossow, 2006 "Mazingira ya Warangi na Wajerumani wa Kale", Published by Heimat- und Kulturverein Gellersen (Society for History and Culture of the Gellersen villages, Germany)
Masare, A.J. 1970 “Utani Relationships: The Rangi”, unpublished manuscript, Dar es Salaam
Mung’ong’o, Claude G. 1995 “Social Processes and Ecology in the Kondoa Irangi Hills, Central Tanzania”, Stockholm University, Dept. of Human Geography, Meddlanden Series B 93
Östberg, W. 1979 “The Kondoa Transformation”, research report no. 76, SIAS: UppsalaUppsala
It was made clear that all Rangi people came from Bahi district in the middle of 18890
 

Ethnic groups in Tanzania
Indigenous peoples of East Africa